Eric Charles Day (6 November 1921 – 10 November 2012)  was an English footballer who played his entire career of nearly 400 Football League games for Southampton. He was born in Dartford, Kent. During his career with the club, which lasted 11 years from 1945 to 1957, he scored 145 league goals, which placed him seventh on the club's list of all-time goalscorers. He was selected to play for the Third Division South representative side in 1954–55.

References

External links
 

1921 births
2012 deaths
Sportspeople from Dartford
English footballers
Association football forwards
Southampton F.C. players
English Football League players